xDT (aka KVDT) is a family of data exchange formats that are used by physicians and health care administration in Germany. They were created by initiative of the Kassenärztliche Bundesvereinigung (National Association of Statutory Health Insurance Physicians - NASHIP).

Formats 

As of October 2013 the following formats have been implemented:

 ADT (Abrechnungsdatentransfer): A format for transferring billing data
 BDT (Behandlungsdatentransfer): A format for exchange of complete electronic health records among electronic health record software systems
 GDT (Gerätedatentransfer): A format to transfer data among medical devices and software systems
 LDT (Labordatentransfer): A format to transfer orders of laboratory tests and their results.

External links 
 NASHIP interface description (in German)
 xDT field directory in gms Wiki

Healthcare in Germany
Standards for electronic health records
Computer file formats